Harry Powlett, 4th Duke of Bolton PC (24 July 1691 – 9 October 1759), known until 1754 as Lord Harry Powlett, was a British nobleman and Whig politician. He sat in the House of Commons from 1715 to 1754, when he took his seat in the House of Lords.

Early life
Born the second son of Charles Paulet, 2nd Duke of Bolton and Frances Ramsden, Powlett started his career in the Royal Navy. He served as an ADC to the Earl of Galway in Portugal, in 1710 during the closing stages of the War of the Spanish Succession.

Political career
Powlett was elected at the 1715 general election as a Member of Parliament (MP) for St Ives in Cornwall. He held the seat until the 1722 general election, when he was returned as MP for Hampshire. He held that seat until he succeeded to the peerage in 1754, with one interruption. At the 1734 general election he was returned both for Hampshire and for Yarmouth. A petition was lodged against the Hampshire result, and he sat for Yarmouth until 1737 when the petition against the Hampshire result was withdrawn, then chose to represent Hampshire rather than Yarmouth for the remainder of the Parliament.

He served as a Gentleman of the Bedchamber to Frederick, Prince of Wales from 1729 to 1751.

Powlett joined the Board of Admiralty in the Whig government in June 1733 and was advanced to Senior Naval Lord in March 1738 but had to stand down when the Government fell from power in March 1742. He went on to serve as Lieutenant of the Tower of London from 1742 to 1754 and was then sworn a Privy Counsellor in January 1755.

He succeeded his elder brother Charles Powlett, 3rd Duke of Bolton to the dukedom in 1754. He died on 9 October 1759 and was succeeded by his eldest son, Charles.

Family

Powlett married Catherine Parry (d. 25 April 1744), by whom he had four children:
Charles Powlett, 5th Duke of Bolton (d. 1765)
Harry Powlett, 6th Duke of Bolton (1720–1794)
Lady Henrietta Powlett (d. 22 December 1753), married on 12 July 1741 Robert Colebrooke of Chilham Castle (d. 1784), no issue
Lady Catherine Powlett (d. 1775), married firstly William Ashe, secondly in 1734 Adam Drummond of Megginch (d. 1786), without issue by either.

The Duke of Bolton's properties included Hackwood Park in Hampshire, Bolton Hall, North Yorkshire, Edington in Wiltshire and Hooke Court in Dorset.

References

Sources

External links
Paulet genealogy

|-

|-

|-

1691 births
1759 deaths
Lord-Lieutenants of Glamorgan
Lord-Lieutenants of Hampshire
Lords of the Admiralty
Powlett, Lord Harry
Powlett, Lord Harry
Powlett, Lord Harry
Powlett, Lord Harry
Powlett, Lord Harry
Powlett, Lord Harry
Powlett, Lord Harry
Powlett, Lord Harry
Whig (British political party) MPs for English constituencies
Members of the Privy Council of Great Britain
Harry
14
Royal Navy personnel of the War of the Austrian Succession
People from Winslade